Mumbai Educational Trust also known as MET League of Colleges is an academic institution located in Bandra, Mumbai and Nashik. It offers degrees in areas including management, information technology, mass media, pharmacy, medical sciences and insurance training research & development.

Campus

Mumbai Campus
 MET Institute of Management
 MET Institute of Mass Media
 MET Asian Management Development Centre
 MET Centre for Insurance Training, Research & Development 
 MET Institute of Pharmacy
 MET Institute of Medical Sciences
 MET Institute of Information Technology
 MET Institute of Software Development and Research
 MET Institute of Computer Science
 MET Institute of International Studies
 MET Rishikul Vidyalaya

Nashik Campus

 Institute of Management, Adgaon 
 Institute of Pharmacy, Adgaon
 Institute of Engineering, Adgaon
 Institute of Technology (Polytechnic), Adgaon
 Institute of Information Technology, Adgaon
 Institute of D. Pharmacy, Adgaon
 School of Architecture and Interior Designing, Gowardhan

Famous Alumni

 John Abraham, Actor

References

Universities and colleges in Mumbai